Powers (stylized as POWERS) is a musical duo composed of Mike Del Rio and Crista Ru.

Their music has been described as alternative pop, electropop, and progressive pop. Time has called their music "groovy and futuristic".

Music
"Gimme Some" was the duo's first official release. Songs include "Dance", "Heavy", "Man on the Moon", "Closer", "Just Kids", and "Georgie". The music video for "Closer" was released in May 2017.

Discography

EPs
 Legendary (2015)

Singles

as lead artist 
 "Touch the World" (2014)
 "Gimme Some" (2014)
 "Money" (2014)
 "Hot" (2015)
 "Legendary" (2015)
 "Loved By You" (2015)
 "Dance" (2017)
 "Heavy" (2017)
 "Man on the Moon" (2017)
 "Closer" (2017)
 "Heavy" (2017)

as featured artist 
 "Classic" (2014), The Knocks featuring POWERS

References

American musical duos
Electropop groups
Progressive pop groups